Planned giving (less commonly known as gift planning ) is an area of fundraising that refers to several specific gift types that can be funded with cash, equity, or property.  These gift vehicles are commonly based on United States tax law, but Canada, the United Kingdom, and other nations are beginning to establish similar laws. In the United States the specific rules of planned giving are defined by the United States Congress and the Internal Revenue Service.

History and etymology
The term "planned giving" was coined in 1969 by Robert F. Sharpe, Sr.:

"A donor usually considers a current gift to your institution as a cash outlay now. To make a deferred gift, a person decides to give at some future date, either a number of years from now or at death. A deferred gift is a present decision to make a future gift, evidenced by a legal contract.

"While the name 'deferred giving' is best known to professionals in the field, it is not a term that communicates very much to the average donor. Therefore, we suggest the term 'planned giving.' When a person makes a planned gift, it suggests forethought."

—Give & Take, a publication of the Sharpe Group, August 1972

Education
The use of planned giving by colleges and universities was pioneered by Allen Hawley at Pomona College. In 1942, Hawley introduced what became known as the Pomona Plan, where members receive a lifetime annuity in exchange for donating to the college upon their death. The plan's model has since been adopted by many other institutions, although the annuity rates offered by Pomona remain among the highest.

Usage

Planned gifts are referred to as such because they require more planning, negotiation and counsel than many other gifts. Planned gifts can result in immediate income, income to charity over time or serve to delay a gift for life or other period of time while the donor or others retain income and/or access to the assets used to fund the gift. Because of the current or future charitable benefits, a number of state and/or federal income tax, capital gains, estate and gift benefits are associated with giving in this way.

Parents who have a child with a disability should ensure that the inheritance they leave for their child does not affect their child's eligibility to social assistance programs such as the Ontario Disability Support Program (ODSP). A Henson trust can be useful to ensure this.

Efforts to encourage planned gifts are popular among thousands of colleges, universities, hospitals, museums and community foundations in the United States. Funds generated through planned gifts are devoted to current funding needs as well as capital projects and endowments.

Reports published during and after the Great Depression of the 1930s indicate that planned gifts provided a higher percentage of philanthropic dollars than in times of economic prosperity. See "Philanthropy in Uncertain Times - A Retrospective 1931-1949" and "Summary of Recent Research on Depression Giving," from the Sharpe Group.

Research shows that planned giving may become considerably more important as a type of philanthropy in the United States due to the aging Baby Boomer population. This is often referred to as the "Great Wealth Transfer." See "Philanthropy's Missing Trillions in the Stanford Social Innovation Review.

Types of planned gifts
By far, the most commonly utilized planned gift is the bequest of property through a person's final will. Other types include:

Charitable bargain sale
Charitable Gift Annuity (CGA)
Charitable Remainder Annuity Trust (CRAT)
Charitable Remainder Unitrust (CRUT)
Charitable remainder trust
Charitable lead annuity trust
Charitable lead trust
Donor Managed Investment Account
Pooled income fund
Retained life estate
Testamentary life income

Assets to give
Securities
Business Interests
Cash
Life insurance
Personal property
Real estate
Retirement plan

References

Marrick, Peter. 2009. The T.A.S.K: The Trusted Advisor's Survival Kit. LexixNeixis Canada Inc.

Philanthropy